The artist Valery Klever was born in the U.S.S.R. He was a very active participant in the [Non-Conformist] movement from 1965-1978. He was involved in the [Bulldozer Exhibition] on September 15, 1974 – which was broken up by a large force. His work also appeared in the Gasonevski Exhibition in Leningrad in 1975; and many other important showings.
Due to political pressure, Klever had to show his paintings in many underground art galleries and home exhibitions. The 300 paintings he made as part of his “Freedom Search” series gained much popularity due to their anti-government sentiment and biblical themes; which gave Klever notoriety with the KGB. For 4 years, Klever and his family faced heavy persecution.

Klever lost his Soviet citizenship in 1978 and moved to America by way of Austria, Germany, and France. He continued to work and exhibit his paintings in all the aforementioned countries.

He currently resides in America and continues to paint.

References

Year of birth missing (living people)
Living people
20th-century Russian painters
Russian male painters
21st-century Russian painters
20th-century Russian male artists
21st-century Russian male artists